Mukim Pekan Tutong is a mukim in Tutong District, Brunei. The population was 10,551 in 2016. It encompasses Pekan Tutong, the district's sole town and administrative centre.

Geography 
The mukim is located in the north-west of Tutong District, bordering the South China Sea to the north-west, Mukim Keriam to the east, Mukim Kiudang to the south-east, Mukim Tanjong Maya to the south and Mukim Telisai to the south-west.

The Tutong River runs its course through the mukim and flows out into South China Sea. There are a few islands along the river, among them the islets of Setawat and Bakuku.

Demographics 
As of 2016 census, the population was 10,551 with  males and  females. The mukim had 1,882 households occupying 1,871 dwellings.

Villages 
As of 2016, the mukim comprised the following census villages:

The municipal area of Pekan Tutong encompasses parts of Bukit Bendera and Kampong Petani.

References 

Pekan Tutong
Tutong District